Events during the year 1112 in Italy.

Deaths
 Benedict of Cagliari - Benedictine Bishop of Dolia, Sardinia

Years of the 12th century in Italy
Italy
Italy